Putian University is a public university located in Putian, Fujian, China.

External links
 Main Putian University website

Universities and colleges in Fujian
Educational institutions established in 2002
2002 establishments in China